The Glenmore Park Brumbies were formed in 1994 and currently fields male and female teams in all junior grades of the Penrith District Rugby League.
The club is based at Ched Towns Reserve in Glenmore Park, New South Wales.

Notable Juniors
Tony Satini (2013- Manly Sea Eagles)
Danny Levi (2015- Newcastle Knights)
Sione Katoa (2015- Penrith Panthers)
Sarah Togatuki (2018- Sydney Roosters)
Sean O’Sullivan (2018- Sydney Roosters)
Shaylee Bent (2019- St George Illawarra Dragons)
Joseph Suaalii (2021- Sydney Roosters)
Jayden Campbell (2021- Gold Coast Titans)
Isaiya Katoa (2023- Dolphins (NRL))

See also

List of rugby league clubs in Australia
Rugby league in New South Wales

References

External links

Rugby league teams in Sydney
Rugby clubs established in 1923
Rugby clubs established in 1994
1923 establishments in Australia
1994 establishments in Australia